Criminally Insane, (also known as Crazy Fat Ethel), is a 1975 horror film written and directed by Nick Millard. Shot on location in San Francisco, it was followed by a 1987 sequel titled Criminally Insane 2.
A remake, Crazy Fat Ethel, was released in 2016.

Plot 

The morbidly obese Ethel Janowski, who is institutionalized because of her bouts of depression and violence, is released into her grandmother's care despite Dr. Gerard's unease about Ethel's discharge. Upon moving into her grandmother's San Francisco home, Ethel begins consuming massive amounts of food, repeatedly claiming that the institution employees had tried to starve her to death. Mrs. Janowski tries to stop Ethel's gorging by emptying the refrigerator and locking the cupboards. When she threatens to call Dr. Gerard, Ethel stabs her to death, then stabs the old woman's hand to get the cabinet key she was holding in a death grip. Ethel locks her grandmother's corpse in a bedroom and places an order for more food. When the delivery boy, Glen Dickie, arrives with the groceries, Ethel does not have nearly enough money, and stabs Dickie with a broken bottle when he tries to leave with the order. Ethel's prostitute sister Rosalie arrives and announces that she will staying for a few days. Ethel ignores calls from her doctor and attempts to cover up the odor of her decaying victims when Rosalie complains about the smell coming from the locked bedroom.

At a bar one night, Rosalie runs into John, her unfaithful, abusive ex-boyfriend and pimp. John follows Rosalie home, managing  to get on her good side, and the two have sex in bed. Dr. Gerard visits, wanting to know why Ethel has been missing her appointments with him. Ethel bludgeons the doctor with a candlestick holder and puts his body with the others. Three days after the murder of the delivery boy, Detective McDonough visits to question Ethel about his disappearance, and leaves after Ethel gives a few evasive statements. That night, Rosalie and John, unable to tolerate the stink coming from Mrs. Janowski's sealed room any longer, decide to break down the door in the morning. After they go back to bed, Ethel murders them, using a cleaver.

Detective McDonough returns to re-interview Ethel, and although she gives contradictory information, the detective leaves without incident. Ethel proceeds to dismember her victims, stuff the pieces into sacks, and drive them out to a seaside area to dump them into the ocean. But too many witnesses are around, so she's forced to take the bags back home and drag them back into the house; on the way in she forgets to close her car's trunk. A suspicious neighbor peers into it, finds a severed hand, and calls the police. In the end, Detective McDonough walks in on Ethel eating one of her dead grandmother's arms.

Cast 

 Priscilla Alden as Ethel Janowski
 Michael Flood as John
 Jane Lambert as Mrs. Janowski (Ethel's grandmother)
 Robert Copple
 George Buck Flower as Detective Sergeant McDonough
 Gina Martine as Mrs. Kendley
 Cliff McDonald as Doctor Gerard
 Charles Egan as Drunk Man
 Sonny La Rocca
 Sandra Shotwell as Nurse
 Lisa Farros as Rosalie Janowski

Production 
Filming started for five weeks in the spring of 1973 on location in San Francisco. Millard stated that before shooting, he made the decision that if he couldn't find a house that was "quite rundown, kind of spooky; the paint peeling off the wall", he wouldn't have made the film because the house "had to be kind of eerie, a place you'd be frightened to be at night".

Release

Home media
The film was released on DVD by E.I. Independent Cinema on September 13, 2005, as a part of a double-feature with Satan's Black Wedding.

Reception 
Dennis Schwartz from Ozus' World Movie Reviews awarded the film a grade B−, calling it "an offbeat and obscure trashy comical horror thriller". Bill Gibron of DVD Talk gave a grade 4½ out of a possible 5 to the film, and wrote, "Oh Lord, you've GOT to love Criminally Insane. This unfettered freak show of a fright flick, starring the world's portliest serial killer (yes, even bigger than John Wayne Gacy and Leatherface, combined) is so downright depraved, so tantalizing in its turgid storytelling and squalid scenarios that words cannot begin to describe its baneful beauty" and "This is the type of movie the 70s are famous for, off the wall experiments in execution and excess. Imagine Kathy Bates blown up like a balloon and running around brandishing a butcher's knife and you start to get the idea of how stellar this fright flick really is. The terror is kept to a minimum, and the storyline is just an excuse to see Ethel eat and kill, but when it's as bloody and bold as this film, who really cares". Similarly, DVD Verdict's David Johnson wrote, "This flick is deserving of its title—it is absolutely crazy" and "This is just a fun, gruesome hour of weirdness".

Alternately, The Terror Trap rated the film two and a half out of five stars, stating that the film never really takes off in spite of treating its premise as a straight psychological horror film and Alden's interesting performance.

See also
 List of American films of 1975

References

External links 
 
 
 Trailer on Vimeo

1975 films
1975 horror films
1970s English-language films
American comedy horror films
American independent films
American black comedy films
American exploitation films
American serial killer films
Necrophilia in film
Films about cannibalism
Films about mental health
American police detective films
Films about prostitution in the United States
Films about food and drink
Films about dysfunctional families
Films set in San Francisco
Films shot in San Francisco
Films set in 1973
American horror thriller films
1970s slasher films
American slasher films
1975 independent films
1970s serial killer films
1970s black comedy films
1975 comedy films
1975 drama films
American splatter films
1970s American films